Dorothy Thompson (1893–1961) was an American journalist.

Dorothy Thompson may also refer to:

Dorothy Thompson (businesswoman) (born 1960), former CEO of Drax Group
Dorothy Thompson (historian) (1923–2011), British historian
Dorothy Thompson (mountaineer) (1888–1961), English mountain climber
Dorothy Burr Thompson (1900–2001), American archaeologist
Dorothy J. Thompson (born 1939), British classicist and papyrologist
Dorothy Ashby (1932–1986), née Dorothy Jeanne Thompson, American jazz harpist and composer
 Dorothy Thompson, a character from the children's show Postman Pat
 Dot Thompson (1914–2001), director at New Theatre, Melbourne